Larry Darnell Hughes Sr. (born January 23, 1979) is an American former professional basketball player. Hughes played for eight different teams during his 14-year career in the National Basketball Association (NBA). Hughes attended Saint Louis University before being selected with the eighth overall pick in the 1998 NBA draft. Hughes is the founder of the Larry Hughes Basketball Academy.

Early years
One of the most heralded basketball players to come out of St. Louis, Hughes started his basketball career at Christian Brothers College High School (CBC), which won the Missouri state championship in 1997. He also led the St. Louis Eagles to an AAU National Championship, the summer prior. He played in the 1997 McDonald's American Game scoring 21 points.

Hughes played 1 season of college basketball at Saint Louis University. He finished the 1997–98 season with per game averages of 20.9 points, 5.1 rebounds, 2.4 assists, and 2.16 steals. He led the Billikens to the NCAA Tournament that year, making it to the second round after a win over University of Massachusetts.

NBA career
Hughes has played for the Philadelphia 76ers, Golden State Warriors, Washington Wizards, Cleveland Cavaliers, Chicago Bulls, New York Knicks, Sacramento Kings, Charlotte Bobcats, and Orlando Magic. He was drafted by Philadelphia in the 1st round of the 1998 NBA draft out of Saint Louis University, where he was named Freshman of the Year. He is known for being a versatile and athletic guard with strong defensive abilities, and was selected to the 2004–05 NBA All-Defensive 1st Team as a member of the Wizards. He led the league in steals per game with 2.89 in 2004–05.

Hughes participated in the 2000 Slam Dunk Contest in Oracle Arena (home of the Golden State Warriors) in Oakland, California.

Hughes signed a five-year $70 million contract with the Cleveland Cavaliers as a free agent in the summer of 2005. He was brought into Cleveland to provide assistance to young superstar LeBron James, the Cavs' first overall draft pick in 2003. In the 2005–06 season he helped LeBron and the Cavs to an 18–10 record before requiring surgery on his broken finger. His last performance before the injury came in a 97–84 home upset of the Detroit Pistons, in which he scored 16 points on 7–10 shooting to go with two steals, five rebounds and three assists.

Prior to injuries in 2005, he averaged 16.2 points, and 37.6 minutes per game. Both of those statistics were the second best on the team, to LeBron James.  He has an ongoing rivalry with former backcourt partner Gilbert Arenas, with whom he played for three seasons, two in Washington and one in Golden State.

On May 2, 2006 Hughes was recipient of the inaugural Austin Carr Good Guy Award, designed to recognize the Cavaliers player who is cooperative and understanding of the media, the community and the public.

On February 21, 2008, Hughes was traded to the Chicago Bulls, in a three-team trade, along with Drew Gooden, Cedric Simmons and Shannon Brown in exchange for Ben Wallace and Joe Smith.

On February 19, 2009 just before the trade deadline, Hughes was traded from the Bulls to the New York Knicks for Tim Thomas, Jerome James, and Anthony Roberson.

On February 18, 2010, Hughes was traded to the Sacramento Kings in a three team deal that also moved Tracy McGrady to the Knicks. He was waived by the Kings on February 23, 2010. On March 13, 2010, he signed with the Charlotte Bobcats for the rest of the season.

On December 9, 2011, Hughes signed a non-guaranteed contract with the Orlando Magic. He was waived on February 1, 2012, after averaging 1.3 points in nine games.

Hughes was selected to play in Ice Cube's BIG3 League on the "Killer 3s" team in the summer of 2017.

NBA career statistics

Regular season 

|-
| align="left" | 
| align="left" | Philadelphia
| 50 || 1 || 19.8 || .411 || .154 || .709 || 3.8 || 1.5 || .9 || .3 || 10.0
|-
| align="left" | 
| align="left" | Philadelphia
| 50 || 5 || 20.4 || .416 || .216 || .746 || 3.2 || 1.5 || 1.1 || .2 || 10.0
|-
| align="left" | 
| align="left" | Golden State
| 32 || 32 || 40.8 || .389 || .243 || .736 || 5.9 || 4.1 || 1.9 || .5 || 22.7
|-
| align="left" | 
| align="left" | Golden State
| 50 || 45 || 36.9 || .383 || .187 || .766 || 5.5 || 4.5 || 1.9 || .6 || 16.5
|-
| align="left" | 
| align="left" | Golden State
| 73 || 56 || 28.1 || .423 || .194 || .737 || 3.4 || 4.3 || 1.5 || .3 || 12.3
|-
| align="left" | 
| align="left" | Washington
| 67 || 56 || 31.9 || .467 || .367 || .731 || 4.6 || 3.1 || 1.3 || .4 || 12.8
|-
| align="left" | 
| align="left" | Washington
| 61 || 61 || 33.8 || .397 || .341 || .797 || 5.3 || 2.4 || 1.6 || .4 || 18.8
|-
| align="left" | 
| align="left" | Washington
| 61 || 61 || 38.7 || .430 || .282 || .777 || 6.3 || 4.7 ||style="background:#cfecec;"| 2.9* || .3 || 22.0
|-
| align="left" | 
| align="left" | Cleveland
| 36 || 31 || 35.6 || .409 || .368 || .756 || 4.5 || 3.6 || 1.5 || .6 || 15.5
|-
| align="left" | 
| align="left" | Cleveland
| 70 || 68 || 37.1 || .400 || .333 || .676 || 3.8 || 3.7 || 1.3 || .4 || 14.9
|-
| align="left" | 
| align="left" | Cleveland
| 40 || 32 || 30.3 || .377 || .341 || .815 || 3.6 || 2.4 || 1.5 || .3 || 12.3
|-
| align="left" | 
| align="left" | Chicago
| 28 || 25 || 28.9 || .387 || .353 || .775 || 3.1 || 3.1 || 1.4 || .2 || 12.0
|-
| align="left" | 
| align="left" | Chicago
| 30 || 6 || 26.4 || .412 || .392 || .817 || 3.1 || 2.0 || 1.2 || .3 || 12.0
|-
| align="left" | 
| align="left" | New York
| 25 || 14 || 27.5 || .390 || .385 || .794 || 2.6 || 2.4 || 1.4 || .2 || 11.2
|-
| align="left" | 
| align="left" | New York
| 31 || 14 || 26.5 || .366 || .289 || .823 || 3.5 || 3.5 || 1.3 || .4 || 9.6
|-
| align="left" | 
| align="left" | Charlotte
| 14 || 2 || 21.1 || .327 || .357 || .853 || 2.3 || 2.0 || .9 || .3 || 8.1
|-
| align="left" | 
| align="left" | Orlando
| 9 || 0 || 12.7 || .227 || .143 || .500 || .6 || .8 || .2 || .0 || 1.3
|-
| align="center" colspan="2" | Career
| 727 || 509 || 30.8 || .406 || .309 || .757 || 4.2 || 3.1 || 1.5 || .4 || 14.1

Playoffs 

|-
| align="left" | 1999
| align="left" | Philadelphia
| 8 || 2 || 24.8 || .403 || .000 || .833 || 4.6 || 2.0 || 1.9 || 1.1 || 10.3
|-
| align="left" | 2005
| align="left" | Washington
| 10 || 10 || 40.1 || .376 || .212 || .831 || 7.1 || 3.7 || 2.0 || .7 || 20.7
|-
| align="left" | 2006
| align="left" | Cleveland
| 9 || 8 || 37.3 || .319 || .278 || .742 || 3.0 || 4.0 || 2.2 || .1 || 11.1
|-
| align="left" | 2007
| align="left" | Cleveland
| 18 || 18 || 35.5 || .347 || .352 || .746 || 3.9 || 2.4 || 1.4 || .4 || 11.3
|-
| align="left" | 2010
| align="left" | Charlotte
| 4 || 0 || 14.5 || .471 || .400 || .571 || 3.3 || 1.5 || .0 || .0 || 6.0
|-
| align="center" colspan="2" | Career
| 49 || 38 || 33.3 || .361 || .287 || .782 || 4.5 || 2.8 || 1.6 || .5 || 12.6

Personal life  
Hughes played Kelly Rowland's boyfriend in the music video of Nelly's single "Dilemma".

In 2014, Hughes started a basketball clinic that later became known as the Larry Hughes Basketball Academy. Since 2019 it has operated out of a facility in Chesterfield, Missouri.

In November 2020, Hughes announced plans to open two cannabis dispensaries in St. Louis with former Knicks teammate Al Harrington.

Hughes is the godfather of Boston Celtics player Jayson Tatum, whose father was Hughes' high school and college teammate.

References

External links

Stats on Basketball-Reference.com

1979 births
Living people
American men's basketball players
Basketball players from St. Louis
Big3 players
Businesspeople in the cannabis industry
Charlotte Bobcats players
Chicago Bulls players
Cleveland Cavaliers players
Golden State Warriors players
McDonald's High School All-Americans
New York Knicks players
Orlando Magic players
Parade High School All-Americans (boys' basketball)
Philadelphia 76ers draft picks
Philadelphia 76ers players
Point guards
Saint Louis Billikens men's basketball players
Shooting guards
Washington Wizards players
American men's 3x3 basketball players